Mary Costello is an Irish short story writer and novelist.

Mary Costello was born in Galway. Costello was a teacher before giving up to write full time. Her collection of short stories, The China Factory, published in 2012, was nominated for the Guardian First Book Award. Her second book and first novel, Academy Street, was shortlisted for the International Dublin Literary Award, the Costa First Novel Prize and the EU Prize for Literature in 2014. The novel went on to win the Irish Novel of the Year Award as well as the Irish Book of the Year. It has since been translated into several languages. Costello was awarded an Arts Council bursary in both 2011 and 2013. Her work has been serialised on BBC Radio 4. Costello lives in Dublin.

Bibliography

 The China Factory (2012)
 Academy Street (2014) 
 The River Capture (2019)

References

Living people
People from Galway (city)
Irish women novelists
Irish women short story writers
21st-century Irish novelists
21st-century Irish women writers
Year of birth missing (living people)
21st-century Irish short story writers